Stanisław (Moishe) Flato (27 June 1910 – 1972) was a Polish army intelligence officer and diplomat.

Born into a Jewish family, he graduated from gymnasium "Ascola" in Warsaw and entered the Warsaw University but finally left for a  medical study in Paris. He became a member of French Communist Party in 1932. Dr. Flato was a volunteer in Spanish Civil War, became a member of Spanish Communist Party and served as a Major in XIII International Brigade, where he remained until February 1939. He was interned in France but that year he was released and went to China in August 1939. He became a member of Communist Party of China, and served as a head of International Red Cross doctors at People's Liberation Army.

After World War II, he returned to Poland in September 1945. He became a member of Polish Workers' Party, and Polish United Workers' Party. Colonel Dr. Flato worked in the Polish General Staff from 1946 to 1952. Then he was arrested (1953-1954). After political rehabilitation, he served as a Chief Adviser at the Polish Embassy in Beijing in 1957–1964, and deputy director at the Department for Asia in Ministry for Foreign Affairs of Poland. After 1968 Polish political crisis, he was forced to retire, but not allowed to emigrate from Poland. He died in East Berlin during a trip 
in 1972.

References 

 Leszek Pawlikowicz, Tajny front zimnej wojny. Uciekinierzy z polskich służb specjalnych 1956-1964, Oficyna Wydawnicza Rytm, Warszawa 2004, .
 Jerzy Poksiński, Represje Wobec Oficerów Wojska Polskiego 1949-1956. Bellona, Warszawa 2002.

1910 births
1972 deaths
Diplomats from Warsaw
People from Warsaw Governorate
Jews from the Russian Empire]
20th-century Polish Jews
Polish communists
Polish intelligence officers (1943–1990)
Polish diplomats
Recipients of the Order of the Cross of Grunwald, 3rd class